Jyri Hietaharju (born 23 April 1981) is a Finnish footballer who represents Vaasan Palloseura of Veikkausliiga.

References
Guardian Football

Finnish footballers
Veikkausliiga players
1981 births
Living people
Vaasan Palloseura players
Seinäjoen Jalkapallokerho players
FC Santa Claus players
Association football midfielders
People from Seinäjoki
Sportspeople from South Ostrobothnia